Diathrausta is a genus of moths of the family Crambidae. The genus was described by Julius Lederer in 1863.

Species
Diathrausta angustella Dyar, 1913
Diathrausta brevifascialis (Wileman, 1911)
Diathrausta cacalis Dyar, 1913
Diathrausta cubanalis Dyar, 1913
Diathrausta delicata (Warren, 1896)
Diathrausta griseifusa Hampson, 1917
Diathrausta harlequinalis Dyar, 1913
Diathrausta leucographa Hampson, 1917
Diathrausta lypera Tams, 1935
Diathrausta minutalis (Druce, 1899)
Diathrausta nerinalis (Walker, 1859)
Diathrausta ochreipennis (Butler, 1886)
Diathrausta ochrifuscalis (Hampson, 1903)
Diathrausta picata (Butler, 1889)
Diathrausta plumbealis (Warren, 1896)
Diathrausta profundalis Lederer, 1863
Diathrausta reconditalis (Walker, 1859)
Diathrausta semilunalis Maes, 2006
Diathrausta stagmatopa (Meyrick, 1933)
Diathrausta yunquealis Schaus, 1940

References

Spilomelinae
Crambidae genera
Taxa named by Julius Lederer